"Come Undone" is a song by British singer Robbie Williams for his fifth studio album Escapology (2002). Written by Williams, Boots Ottestad, Ashley Hamilton, and Daniel Pierre, it was released as the second single from Escapology on 31 March 2003 by Chrysalis Records. "Come Undone" peaked at number four on the UK Singles Chart and reached the top 20 in seven other European countries.

Composition
"Come Undone" lyrically tells the story of a life of fame unravelling in excess, featuring some "wry" observations from Robbie Williams, including the telling lines of the song's bridge: "Do another interview/Sing a bunch of lies/Tell about celebrities that I despise/And sing love songs/We sing love songs/So sincere".

Chart performance
The song reached number four in the United Kingdom, falling out of the top 10 in its second week. Worldwide, the single did not equal the success of Williams' previous single, "Feel", reaching the top 20 in Austria, Denmark, Germany, Hungary, Ireland, Italy, and the Netherlands.

Music video
The Jonas Åkerlund directed music video features a hungover Robbie waking up in the morning after a large house party the previous evening. He then proceeds to walk around the house, wearing pink socks, as flashbacks of the events of the night before are shown. As the song reaches its climax, Williams is seen participating in three-way sex with two women (who are in fact porn stars). These shots are interspersed with graphic and unsettling images of snakes, rats and bugs, mostly crawling on beautiful women. In the final shots, the two women have become men in drag, perhaps a subtle reference to the media's infatuation with Williams' sexuality. The song also contains numerous explicit words.

Controversy
The video was heavily censored by MTV Networks Europe for depicting a fully clothed Williams having three-way sex with both women and men in drag. The uncensored version of the video was released as a DVD single in Europe and was also included on the enhanced CD single. BBC Radio 2 also banned the song for its explicit content. During this time, it was confirmed that Williams and Guy Chambers were to officially part ways.

Knebworth performances
A memorable performance of the song took place at one of Williams' concerts at Knebworth in August 2003. Singing to 125,000 people, he interjected with "Britain, I'm your son", and further interacted with the audience when he brought a girl up on stage.

Track listings

UK CD single
 "Come Undone" – 4:34
 "One Fine Day" – 3:36
 "Happy Easter (War Is Coming)" – 4:03
 Photo gallery
 Robbie video clips

UK cassette single
 "Come Undone"
 "One Fine Day"
 "Happy Easter (War Is Coming)"

European CD single
 "Come Undone" – 3:34
 "One Fine Day" – 3:36

UK DVD single
 "Come Undone" (video) – 4:34
 "One Fine Day" (audio) – 3:36
 "Happy Easter (War Is Coming)" (audio) – 4:03
 Robbie photo gallery
 Robbie live video clip

Credits and personnel
Credits are taken from the Escapology album booklet.

Recording
 Recorded in Los Angeles and London
 Mixed at The Record Plant (Los Angeles)
 Mastered at Marcussen Mastering (Los Angeles)

Personnel

 Robbie Williams – writing, lead vocals, backing vocals
 Boots Ottestad – writing, keyboards
 Ashley Hamilton – writing
 Daniel Pierre – writing, piano, keyboards
 Phil Spalding – electric guitars, bass
 Neil Taylor – electric guitars
 Jeremy Stacey – drums
 London Session Orchestra – orchestra
 Gavyn Wright – concertmaster
 Sally Herbert – orchestral arrangement
 Steve Price – orchestral engineering
 Tom Jenkins – assistant orchestral engineering
 Isobel Griffiths – orchestral contracting
 Jim Brumby – programming, additional engineering
 Guy Chambers – production
 Steve Power – production, mixing
 J.D. Andrew – assistant mixing
 Richard Flack – engineering, programming
 Steve Marcussen – mastering

Charts

Weekly charts

Year-end charts

Certifications

Release history

References

External links
 the Clean version of the music video, comments about the video, and extra material, requires QuickTime 5.02 or higher.

2002 songs
2003 singles
Chrysalis Records singles
Music video controversies
LGBT-related controversies in music
Obscenity controversies in music
Robbie Williams songs
Song recordings produced by Guy Chambers
Song recordings produced by Steve Power
Songs written by Robbie Williams